This article contains a chronological summary of major events from the 2012 Summer Olympics in London.

All times are in British Summer Time (UTC+1).

Calendar

Wed 25 July
Football
 The first competitions of the Games started at 16:00. The first events were women's football matches, with six preliminary round matches held.
Cristiane of Brazil scored her 11th Olympic goal, setting the women's record for most goals in the Olympics.
 A mistake occurred at the North Korea v. Colombia women's football match, as organisers mistakenly displayed the South Korean flag for the North Korean players.  The North Korean team refused to take the field for nearly an hour.  The organisers corrected the error and apologised.

Thu 26 July
Football
 The competitions started at 12:00. The events at the men's football matches included eight preliminary round matches held.

Fri 27 July
Archery
The ranking round for men began at 9:00; for women at 13:00.
In the men's competition, Im Dong-Hyun of South Korea set an individual world record of 699 points for 72 arrows. The South Korean team also set a new world record for a 216 arrow total, with 2,087 points.

Opening ceremony
 The Games officially began with the opening ceremony and Parade of Nations in the evening.
The Olympic Cauldron was lit by seven young sportspeople, each of whom had been nominated by a past British Olympian. The seven were; Cameron MacRitchie, rower, nominated by Steve Redgrave; Adelle Tracey, athlete, nominated by Kelly Holmes; Katie Kirk, athlete, nominated by Mary Peters; Desirèe Henry, athlete, nominated by Daley Thompson; Jordan Duckitt, nominated by Duncan Goodhew; Aidan Reynolds, javelin thrower, nominated by Lynn Davies; Callum Airlie, sailor, nominated by Shirley Robertson.

Day 1: Sat 28 July

Archery
 Italy won the men's team final, defeating the United States, 219–218.

Cycling
 Alexander Vinokourov of Kazakhstan won the men's road race, with a time of 5:45:57.

Fencing
 In the women's foil, Italy took all three medals, with Elisa Di Francisca, Arianna Errigo and Valentina Vezzali winning gold, silver and bronze, respectively.

Judo
 Brazil's Sarah Menezes defeated Romania's Alina Dumitru in the women's extra-lightweight final.
 Arsen Galstyan of Russia defeated Hiroaki Hiraoka of Japan in the men's extra-lightweight final.

Rowing
 New Zealand's men's coxless pair of Eric Murray and Hamish Bond set a new world record of 6:08.50.
 New Zealand's men's double sculls of Nathan Cohen and Joseph Sullivan set a new Olympic record in the heats with a time of 6:11.30.
 Great Britain's Helen Glover and Heather Stanning set a new Olympic record of 6:57.29 in the heats of the women's coxless pair.
 Tim Maeyens of Belgium set an Olympic record in the heats of the men's single sculls.

Shooting
 Yi Siling of China won the first gold medal of the Games in the women's 10 metre air rifle.
 South Korea's Jin Jong-oh won the gold medal of the men's 10 metre air pistol final.

Swimming
 Ryan Lochte of the United States won his first gold medal, completing the men's 400-metre individual medley final in 4:05.18. Michael Phelps finished 4th and out of the medals at an Olympic event for the first time since the 2000 Olympics in Sydney.
 Sun Yang of China set a new Olympic record, completing the men's 400 metre freestyle final in 3:40.14. Sun also became the first Chinese male swimmer to win an Olympic gold medal. Meanwhile, silver medallist Park Tae-Hwan (South Korea) had been disqualified after the heats for a false start, but was reinstated after an appeal.
 Ye Shiwen of China established a new world record of 4:28.43 in winning the women's 400 metre individual medley.
 Australia won the women's 4 × 100 metre freestyle relay in a new Olympic record time of 3:33.15.
 In the women's 100-metre butterfly heats, American Dana Vollmer set a new Olympic record, 56.25.

Weightlifting
 Wang Mingjuan of China won the gold medal in the women's 48 kg final.
 Albanian weightlifter Hysen Pulaku, an entrant in the men's 77 kg division, was disqualified after testing positive for the banned steroid stanozolol.

Day 2: Sun 29 July

Archery
South Korea defeated China, 210–209, in the women's team final, while Japan defeated Russia for bronze, 209–207.

Cycling
Marianne Vos of the Netherlands won the women's road race gold, while Great Britain won silver and Russia won bronze.

Diving
Teaming with her partner He Zi, China's Wu Minxia won her third consecutive gold medal in the  women's synchronised 3 metre springboard.

Fencing
Áron Szilágyi won Hungary's first gold medal, defeating Italy's Diego Occhiuzzi, 15–8, in the men's sabre final.

Gymnastics
Luiza Galiulina of Uzbekistan was suspended after traces of banned diuretic furosemide were found in a urine sample.

Judo
North Korea's An Kum-Ae defeated Cuba's Yanet Bermoy in the women's half-lightweight final.
Lasha Shavdatuashvili of Georgia won the men's half-lightweight final against Miklós Ungvári of Hungary.

Shooting
China's Guo Wenjun won the gold medal in the women's 10 metre air pistol final, while France's Céline Goberville defeated Ukraine's Olena Kostevych in a tie-breaking shoot-out to claim the silver.
American Kim Rhode compiled an Olympic record of 99 points to win the gold medal in the women's skeet, becoming the first US athlete to medal in individual events at five Olympics.

Swimming
 American Dana Vollmer won the gold medal in the women's 100 metre butterfly, setting a world record of 55.98.
Cameron van der Burgh of South Africa set a world record of 58.46 to win the gold medal in the men's 100 metre breaststroke.
France's Camille Muffat won the gold medal in the women's 400 metre freestyle in an Olympic record time of 4:01.54.
Yannick Agnel look the lead in the final lap of the men's 4 × 100 metre freestyle relay final to give France victory.

Weightlifting
Kazakhstan's Zulfiya Chinshanlo set a world record in the clean and jerk, lifting 131 kg, en route to winning the gold medal in the women's 53 kg.
Om Yun-Chol of North Korea won the gold medal in the men's 56 kg, setting an Olympic record of lifting 168 kg in the clean and jerk.

Day 3: Mon 30 July
Diving
Cao Yuan and Zhang Yanquan of China won the gold medal in the men's synchronized 10 metre platform diving.

Fencing
Controversy surrounded the semi-finals of the women's épée, as judges awarded Germany's Britta Heidemann a 6–5 victory over South Korea's Shin A-Lam after complaints over the time keeping during the last seconds of the match.
Ukraine's Yana Shemyakina defeated Heidemann in the gold medal match of the women's épée, 9–8, while China's Sun Yujie defeated Shin in the bronze medal match, 15–11.

Gymnastics
China won gold in the men's artistic team all-around; with Japan earning the silver medal; and Great Britain taking the bronze, the host nation's first Olympic team gymnastics medal in a century. An appeal and a video review overturned an initial ruling on Kōhei Uchimura's dismount off the pommel horse, raising Japan's score from fourth to the silver medal position, and dropping Ukraine out of the medals.

Judo
Kaori Matsumoto won Japan's first gold medal of the 2012 games in the women's lightweight, defeating Romania's Corina Căprioriu in the final.
Russia's Mansur Isaev won gold in the men's lightweight final against Riki Nakaya of Japan.

Shooting
Alin Moldoveanu of Romania won the men's 10 metre air rifle final, while Italy's Niccolò Campriani took home silver, and India's Gagan Narang won bronze. Both Moldoveanu and Campriani tied the Olympic qualification round record of 599.

Swimming
Yannick Agnel won his second gold medal, and France's third swimming gold medal in two days, in the men's 200 metre freestyle.  There was a dead heat for second place, with both Sun Yang and Park Tae-Hwan receiving silver medals.
American Missy Franklin won gold in the women's 100 metre backstroke.
Matt Grevers of the United States set a new Olympic record of 52.16 to win gold in the men's 100 metre backstroke.
Fifteen-year-old Rūta Meilutytė of Lithuania won gold at the women's 100 metre breaststroke, the country's first ever swimming medal at the Olympics. She defeated the defending Olympic champion United States' Rebecca Soni by 0.08 seconds.

Weightlifting
China's Li Xueying set new Olympic records in the snatch with 108 kg and in total weight lift with 246 kg en route to claiming the gold medal in the women's 58 kg final.
Kim Un-Guk of North Korea lifted an Olympic record 153 kg in the snatch, as well as a new world record of 327 kg total, to win gold in the men's 62 kg final. Colombian silver medalist Óscar Figueroa also broke a clean and jerk Olympic record when he lifted 177 kg.

Day 4: Tue 31 July
Badminton
 Officials of the Badminton World Federation charged eight players of trying to deliberately lose their last group stage matches in order to draw favourable matchups in the knockout stage of the women's doubles.

Canoeing
France's Tony Estanguet won gold in the men's slalom C-1 final, while Sideris Tasiadis of Germany won silver, and Michal Martikán of Slovakia won bronze.

Diving
Chen Ruolin and Wang Hao of China won gold in the women's synchronised 10 metre platform final, while Paola Espinosa and Alejandra Orozco of Mexico won silver, and Meaghan Benfeito and Roseline Filion of Canada won bronze.

Equestrian
Germany claimed the first Equestrian gold of the 2012 Olympic Games in the team eventing final, with Great Britain taking the silver and New Zealand winning the bronze.
Michael Jung of Germany won gold in the Individual eventing, while Sara Algotsson Ostholt of Sweden won silver, and Sandra Auffarth of Germany won bronze.

Fencing
Lei Sheng of China defeated Alaaeldin Abouelkassem of Egypt in the gold medal match of the men's foil, 15–13, while Choi Byung-Chul of South Korea defeated Andrea Baldini, 15–14, to win the bronze.

Gymnastics
The United States won gold in the women's artistic team all-around final with Russia claiming silver and Romania finishing third for bronze.

Judo
Urška Žolnir of Slovenia won gold in the women's 63 kg final, beating China's Xu Lili.
Kim Jae-Bum of South Korea won gold in the men's 81 kg final, beating Germany's Ole Bischof by yuko.  This was the reverse of the 2008 Olympics when Bischof defeated Kim by yuko for the gold.

Shooting
Vincent Hancock of the United States won his second successive gold medal in the men's skeet final, setting a new Olympic record of 123. Anders Golding of Denmark won silver, and Nasser Al-Attiyah of Qatar won bronze.

Swimming
Allison Schmitt of the United States won gold in the women's 200 metre freestyle in a new Olympic record time of 1:53.61.
South Africa's Chad le Clos claimed gold in the men's 200 metre butterfly with the United States' Michael Phelps claiming the silver and Takeshi Matsuda of Japan winning the bronze.  Le Clos finished 0.05 seconds ahead of Phelps.
Ye Shiwen of China claimed gold in the women's 200 metre individual medley with an Olympic record of 2:07.57, while Alicia Coutts of Australia won silver.
The United States won gold in the men's 4 × 200 metre freestyle relay. Michael Phelps, swimming the final leg, won a record 19th Olympic medal.

Weightlifting
Maiya Maneza of Kazakhstan won gold in the women's 63 kg final, setting an Olympic record of 245 kg, with Svetlana Tsarukayeva of Russia winning silver, and Christine Girard of Canada winning bronze.
China's Lin Qingfeng claimed gold in the Men's 69 kg, while Indonesia's Triyatno won silver, and Romania's Răzvan Martin won bronze.

Day 5: Wed 1 August
Badminton
 All four women doubles team accused of throwing badminton matches the prior day were disqualified. They were the Indonesian team, both teams from South Korea, and the world champion team from China.

Boxing
 In the men's bantamweight round of 16, Azerbaijan's Magomed Abdulhamidov was given the win over Japan's Satoshi Shimizu despite having been knocked down five times in the last round.  Japan filed an appeal which overturned the win. The referee from Turkmenistan was subsequently expelled from the games.
 In the men's heavyweight round of 16, Iran's Ali Mazaheri was disqualified because he received three penalties for holding giving Cuba's José Larduet the win. The referee from Germany subsequently received a five-day suspension for questionable judgement.

Canoeing
Daniele Molmenti of Italy took gold in the men's slalom K-1 final, while Vavřinec Hradilek gave the Czech Republic its first medal with his silver, and Hannes Aigner took bronze.

Cycling
The United States' Kristin Armstrong successfully defended her title in the women's road time trial, with Germany's Judith Arndt second, and Russia's Olga Zabelinskaya third.
Bradley Wiggins of Great Britain won the men's road time trial, while Tony Martin of Germany took silver, and Chris Froome of Great Britain won bronze. Wiggins' gold was his seventh Olympic medal, a new record for a British Olympian.

Diving
China's Luo Yutong and Qin Kai took gold in the men's synchronised 3 metre springboard final, ahead of Russia's Evgeny Kuznetsov and Ilya Zakharov who took silver, and Troy Dumais and Kristian Ipsen, of the United States, who were third.

Fencing
Rubén Limardo won Venezuela's first Olympic gold medal since 1968, defeating Norway's Bartosz Piasecki in the men's épée final, 15–10.
Kim Ji-Yeon of South Korea defeated Sofiya Velikaya of Russia, 15–9, in the women's sabre final.

Gymnastics
Kōhei Uchimura of Japan took gold in the men's artistic individual all-around final, while Marcel Nguyen of Germany took silver, and Danell Leyva of the United States took bronze.

Judo
France's Lucie Décosse defeated Germany's Kerstin Thiele to win gold in the women's 70 kg.
Song Dae-Nam of South Korea defeated Cuba's Asley González in the men's 90 kg final.

Rowing
  Germany won gold in the men's eight, with Canada taking silver and Great Britain in third.
 Helen Glover and Heather Stanning of Great Britain earned the host nation's first gold in the women's coxless pair final, while Australia took silver and New Zealand took bronze.
 Kateryna Tarasenko, Nataliya Dovgodko, Anastasiya Kozhenkova, and Yana Dementyeva of Ukraine took gold in the women's quadruple sculls final, ahead of Germany and the United States.

Shooting
South Korea's Kim Jang-Mi won gold in the women's 25 metre pistol, narrowly beating the defending 2008 Olympic gold medalist, Chen Ying of China.

Swimming
Hungary's Dániel Gyurta set a new world record of 2:07.28 to win gold in the Men's 200 metre breaststroke.  Michael Jamieson of Great Britain claimed the silver and Japan's Ryo Tateishi earned the bronze.
Jiao Liuyang won gold in the Women's 200 metre butterfly in a new Olympic record time of 2:04.06. Mireia Belmonte of Spain won the silver medal and Natsumi Hoshi of Japan won the bronze medal.
 Nathan Adrian of the United States won gold by 0.01 seconds in the men's 100 metre freestyle, and became the first American to claim the title in this sporting event since Matt Biondi in 1988. James Magnussen of Australia claimed the silver and Canada's Brent Hayden earned the bronze.
 The United States set a new Olympic record of 7:42.92 to win the gold medal in the Women's 4 × 200 metre freestyle relay.  Australia won the silver and France took the bronze.

Table tennis
China's Li Xiaoxia beat her compatriot Ding Ning in the gold medal match of the women's singles.  Feng Tianwei of Singapore defeated Kasumi Ishikawa of Japan in the bronze medal match.

Weightlifting
North Korea's Rim Jong-Sim claimed gold in the women's 69 kg, while Romania's Roxana Cocoș won the silver and Belarus' Maryna Shkermankova earned bronze.
China's Lü Xiaojun won gold in the men's 77 kg, setting two new world records with a lift of 175 kg in the snatch and a total weightage of 379 kg. Lu Haojie of China won silver despite picking up an injury during the snatch, while Cuba's Iván Cambar won the bronze.

Day 6: Thu 2 August
Archery
The final of the women's individual was tied after five rounds, before Ki Bo-bae of South Korea beat Mexico's Aída Román in a single arrow shoot-off. Mariana Avitia, also of Mexico, won the bronze.

Canoeing
Great Britain took both gold and silver medals in the men's slalom C-2 final, with Tim Baillie and Etienne Stott beating David Florence and Richard Hounslow, while Slovakian twins Pavol and Peter Hochschorner took bronze. 	
Émilie Fer of France won the women's slalom K-1, with Australia's Jessica Fox second and Maialen Chourraut (Spain) third.

Cycling
In the women's team sprint, the world record was beaten by Great Britain, and subsequently by China, in the qualification, before China improved the record further in the first round. Germany won the gold medal after Britain were relegated in the first round, and China in the final, both for exchange of riders outside the designated area. China took the silver medals, and Australia the bronze.
Great Britain won the men's team sprint, having set world records in both the first round and the final, allowing Chris Hoy to equal Steve Redgrave's British record of five Olympic gold medals.  France finished second, with Germany third.  A minor controversy erupted when German-born Philip Hindes of the gold medal British team told the BBC that the team had pre-planned a crash in case they did not start fast enough. British Cycling suggested Hindes' comments were "lost in translation".
In the men's team pursuit, Great Britain set a world record of 3:52.499 in the qualification round.

Fencing
Italy won the women's team foil final, defeating Russia 45–31. South Korea was victorious against France, 45–32, in the bronze medal match.

Gymnastics
American Gabby Douglas finished ahead of Russian Viktoria Komova in the women's artistic individual all-around final to win the gold. Russian Aliya Mustafina was awarded the bronze ahead of American Aly Raisman based on the "sum of the three highest apparatus scores" tiebreaker.

Judo
In the women's 78 kg final, Kayla Harrison became the first Olympic judo gold medalist ever for the United States with her win over Gemma Gibbons of Great Britain by yuko.
Russian Tagir Khaybulaev won the men's 100 kg final, beating Naidangiin Tüvshinbayar who became the first Olympic multimedalist from Mongolia.

Rowing
New Zealand world champions Nathan Cohen and Joseph Sullivan won the men's double sculls final, with Italy and Slovenia finishing second and third respectively.
South Africa won the country's first ever gold medal in rowing in the men's lightweight coxless four, with Great Britain coming second and Denmark third.
The women's eight final was won by defending champions the United States, ahead of Canada and the Netherlands.

Shooting
Peter Wilson of Great Britain won the men's double trap by two shots from Sweden's Håkan Dahlby, with Vasily Mosin of Russia winning a shoot-off for bronze.

Swimming
American Rebecca Soni set a world record of 2:19.59 to win the women's 200 metre breaststroke final.
Tyler Clary of the United States won gold at the Men's 200 metre backstroke final with an Olympic record of 1:53.41. Japan's Ryosuke Irie won silver and American Ryan Lochte, the defending champion won bronze.
Michael Phelps extended his Olympic medal records and became the first male swimmer to win gold in the same event at three consecutive Olympics, by winning the men's 200 metre individual medley final.
Another Olympic record fell during the women's 100 metre freestyle final when Ranomi Kromowidjojo of the Netherlands won gold with a time of 53.00.

Table tennis
China's Zhang Jike defeated his compatriot Wang Hao in the men's singles final in five sets.

Day 7: Fri 3 August
Archery
South Korea's Oh Jin-Hyek added gold in the men's individual event to the bronze he won in the team event. Takaharu Furukawa of Japan took the silver with bronze going to China's Dai Xiaoxiang.

Athletics
Poland's Tomasz Majewski successfully defended the men's shot put title he won in Beijing in 2008.  David Storl of Germany claimed the silver medal and Reese Hoffa of the United States took bronze.
Ethiopia's Tirunesh Dibaba retained her women's 10,000 metres title with Sally Kipyego and Vivian Cheruiyot taking silver and bronze for Kenya.

Badminton
Zhang Nan and Zhao Yunlei of China won gold in the mixed doubles beating compatriots Xu Chen and Ma Jin in the final, while Denmark's Joachim Fischer Nielsen and Christinna Pedersen won the bronze.

Boxing
The AIBA Olympic Compliance Committee expelled international technical official Aghajan Abiyev of Azerbaijan "for breaching the governing body's code of conduct by communicating with others about the competition – especially persons from one's own country or national federation".

Cycling
Great Britain won the men's team pursuit in a new world record time of 3:51.659, beating Australia in the final to defend the title they won at the 2008 Games. New Zealand won the bronze.
Victoria Pendleton of Great Britain took gold in the first Olympic women's keirin, China's Guo Shuang was second and Lee Wai-sze of Hong Kong, who only reached the second round via a repechage, won bronze.

Fencing
South Korea won gold in the men's team sabre with Romania taking the silver and Italy earning the bronze.

Gymnastics
China's Dong Dong won gold in the men's trampoline.

Judo
 Cuba's Idalys Ortiz won gold at women's +78 kg over Japan's Mika Sugimoto by judges' decision. Ortíz also defeated defending Olympic champion China's Tong Wen by yuko in the semi-final.
 Five time world champion France's Teddy Riner won gold at men's +100 kg over Russia's Alexander Mikhaylin by waza-ari.

Rowing
Germany won the men's quadruple sculls with the same crew that won the 2011 World Championships, Croatia won silver and 2012 World Champions Australia took bronze.
Three times world champions Hamish Bond and Eric Murray won the men's coxless pair for New Zealand.
Great Britain won the women's double sculls through Anna Watkins and Katherine Grainger, Grainger having taken silver at three previous Olympic Games.
Five time world champion, Mahé Drysdale of New Zealand won gold in the men's single sculls.

Shooting
Sergei Martynov of Belarus set a new world record of 705.5 as he claimed gold in the men's 50 metre rifle prone.
Leuris Pupo of Cuba won gold in the men's 25 metre rapid fire pistol equalling the world record of 34 in the final.

Swimming
Missy Franklin of the United States set a new world record time of 2:04.06 to win gold in the women's 200 metre backstroke. Anastasia Zuyeva of Russia won the silver medal and Elizabeth Beisel, also of the United States, took bronze.
Michael Phelps claimed his record 17th Olympics gold medal in the men's 100 metre butterfly.  There was a dead heat for second place, with both Chad le Clos of South Africa and Yevgeny Korotyshkin of Russia receiving silver medals.
Fifteen-year-old Katie Ledecky of the United States claimed gold in the women's 800 metre freestyle with Spain's Mireia Belmonte taking the silver medal and defending Olympic champion Rebecca Adlington of Great Britain earning the bronze.
France's Florent Manaudou won gold in the men's 50 metre freestyle with Cullen Jones of the United States taking silver and Brazil's César Cielo finishing third for bronze.

Weightlifting
Kazakhstan's Svetlana Podobedova took gold in the women's 75 kg, having lifted the same weight as silver medalist, Russia's Natalia Zabolotnaya, she was awarded the win based on her lighter weight by 220 grams. Iryna Kulesha of Belarus took bronze.
Adrian Zieliński of Poland claimed gold in the men's 85 kg with Apti Aukhadov of Russia winning the silver medal after both lifted the same total weight the Pole took the title due to his lower bodyweight. Bronze went to Iran's Kianoush Rostami.

Day 8: Sat 4 August
Athletics
Chen Ding of China claimed gold in the men's 20 kilometres walk with a new Olympic record time of 1:18.46.  Erick Barrondo of Guatemala earned the silver medal and China's Wang Zhen took the bronze. Barrondo's medal was the first ever Olympic medal for Guatemala.
Croatia's Sandra Perković won gold in the women's discus throw with Darya Pishchalnikova of Russia taking the silver and Li Yanfeng of China winning bronze.
Great Britain's Jessica Ennis claimed gold in the women's heptathlon with a score of 6,955 points was 306 clear of silver medalist, Lilli Schwarzkopf of Germany, and 327 more than Russia's bronze medalist Tatyana Chernova.
Great Britain's Greg Rutherford won gold in the men's long jump with a jump of 8.31 metres.
Mo Farah of Great Britain won the men's 10,000 metres ahead of his training partner Galen Rupp of the United States, who won silver and third-placed Tariku Bekele of Ethiopia. Two-time defending Olympic champion Kenenisa Bekele, brother of Tariku, was fourth.
Shelly-Ann Fraser-Pryce of Jamaica won the women's 100 metres, defending the title she won in 2008. American Carmelita Jeter was second and Jamaican Veronica Campbell-Brown third.

Badminton
China's Li Xuerui took gold in the women's singles beating compatriot Wang Yihan in the final. Saina Nehwal of India took bronze after China's Wang Xin withdrew due to injury.
In an event in which four pairs had been disqualified earlier in the Games, China won gold in the women's doubles with Tian Qing and Zhao Yunlei defeating Japan's Mizuki Fujii and Reika Kakiiwa.  Russia's Valeria Sorokina and Nina Vislova claimed the bronze medal.

Cycling
Great Britain trio Danielle King, Laura Trott and Joanna Rowsell won the gold medal in the women's team pursuit in a new world record time of 3:14.051.  The United States claimed silver and Canada took bronze.

Fencing
Third seeds China won the women's team épée, beating South Korea in the final. United States won the bronze after beating Russia in overtime.

Gymnastics
Rosie MacLennan of Canada took gold in the women's trampoline with China's Huang Shanshan and He Wenna taking silver and bronze respectively.

Rowing
Great Britain won gold in the men's coxless four; Tom James, Pete Reed and Andrew Triggs Hodge who each won gold in the event in 2008, were joined in the crew by Alex Gregory as Great Britain won the event for the fourth consecutive Games. Australia took the silver and the United States the bronze.
Katherine Copeland and Sophie Hosking of Great Britain took gold in the women's lightweight double sculls, with China winning silver and Greece taking bronze.
Denmark took gold in the men's lightweight double sculls final ahead of Great Britain who earned the silver with New Zealand claiming the bronze.
Miroslava Knapková of the Czech Republic won gold in the women's single sculls with Fie Udby Erichsen of Denmark taking the silver and Kim Crow of Australia the bronze. The medal was the Czech Republic's first gold in rowing since gaining independence in 1993.

Shooting
Jamie Lynn Gray of the United States won gold in the Women's 50 metre rifle three positions finals with a new Olympic record of 691.9.  Serbia's Ivana Maksimović took the silver and Adéla Sýkorová of the Czech Republic won bronze.
Italy's Jessica Rossi won gold in the women's trap with a new world record of 99.  Zuzana Štefečeková of Slovakia and Delphine Réau of France took silver and bronze after a three way shoot off with San Marino's Alessandra Perilli who missed out on earning the country's first ever Olympic medal.

Swimming
In the women's 50 metre freestyle, Ranomi Kromowidjojo of the Netherlands won her second gold medal of the Games with a new Olympic record time of 24.05.  Aleksandra Gerasimenya of Belarus took silver and Marleen Veldhuis, also of the Netherlands, took bronze.
China's Sun Yang broke his own world record with a time of 14:31.02 in winning gold in the men's 1500 metre freestyle. Ryan Cochrane of Canada won silver and Tunisia's Oussama Mellouli won bronze.
The United States took gold in the Women's 4 × 100 metre medley relay with a new world record time of 3:52.05.
The United States took gold in the men's 4 × 100 metre medley relay giving Michael Phelps his 18th Olympic gold medal.

Tennis
 Serena Williams won gold in the women's singles tournament for the United States, completing a career "Golden Slam" having already won all of tennis's grand slam events. She defeated Maria Sharapova of Russia, 6–0, 6–1. Victoria Azarenka of Belarus earns bronze, beating Maria Kirilenko, 6–3, 6–4, in the bronze medal match.
 Bob and Mike Bryan won the final of the men's doubles tournament, earning gold for the United States. They defeated Jo-Wilfried Tsonga and Michaël Llodra of France, 6–4, 7–6 (7–2). Julien Benneteau and Richard Gasquet of France earn bronze, beating David Ferrer and Feliciano López of Spain, 7–6 (7–4), 6–2.

Triathlon
In the women's triathlon, a photo-finish was needed to determine Nicola Spirig of Switzerland as winner ahead of Sweden's Lisa Nordén, both being given the same time to 1/100th of a second.  Erin Densham of Australia had also been involved in the final sprint and took the bronze medal.

Weightlifting
Kazakhstan's Ilya Ilin took gold in the men's 94 kg setting a new world record of 233 kg in the clean and jerk and 418 kg in total weight.

Day 9: Sun 5 August
Athletics
In a race featuring the four fastest men in history, Jamaica's Usain Bolt ran 9.63 seconds, an Olympic record and the second fastest time ever recorded, to retain his men's 100 metres title. Bolt's compatriot Yohan Blake won silver and the United States' Justin Gatlin took bronze.
Ezekiel Kemboi of Kenya won gold in the men's 3000 metres steeplechase ahead of Mahiedine Mekhissi-Benabbad from France and follow Kenyan Abel Mutai.
Hungary's Krisztián Pars won gold in the men's hammer with a throw of 80.59 metres. Silver went to Primož Kozmus of Slovenia and bronze to Japan's Koji Murofushi.
Sanya Richards-Ross of the United States won gold in the women's 400 metres in a time of 49.55 seconds. Silver went to 2008 gold medallist Christine Ohuruogu and bronze to American DeeDee Trotter.
Tiki Gelana of Ethiopia set a new Olympic record time of 2:23.07 as she won the women's marathon. Kenyan Priscah Jeptoo won silver and bronze went to Tatyana Petrova Arkhipova of Russia.
In the final of the women's triple jump Kazakhstan's Olga Rypakova jumped 14.98 metres to win the gold medal. Colombian jumper Caterine Ibargüen won silver and reigning world champion Olha Saladukha of Ukraine took bronze.

Badminton
Lin Dan of China won gold in the men's singles, beating Malaysia's Lee Chong Wei, who took silver, in the final. China's Chen Long won bronze.
Chinese pair Cai Yun and Fu Haifeng won gold in the men's doubles beating Denmark's Mathias Boe and Carsten Mogensen who took silver with Jung Jae-sung and Lee Yong-dae of South Korea taking bronze.

Boxing
Women's boxing made its début at the Olympic Games, with Russia's Elena Savelyeva and North Korea's Kim Hye-Song facing each other in the first bout of the flyweight event.

Cycling
Denmark's Lasse Norman Hansen won gold in the men's omnium as the event made its debut at the Olympics. France's Bryan Coquard won silver and Great Britain's Ed Clancy, who had already won gold in the team pursuit, took bronze.

Diving
China's Wu Minxia won the gold in women's 3 metres springboard; the medal was her record equalling sixth in the sport of diving at the Olympics. He Zi, also from China took silver and Laura Sánchez of Mexico won the bronze.

Fencing
Italy took gold in the men's team foil with Japan taking silver and Germany winning bronze.

Gymnastics
In the men's floor Chinese gymnast Zou Kai successfully defended his gold medal. The silver medal went to Japan's Kōhei Uchimura and bronze to Russia's Denis Ablyazin
Hungary's Krisztián Berki won gold in the men's pommel horse; Berki's overall score of 16.066 was tied with that of silver medalist Louis Smith of Great Britain, but he won gold based on a higher execution score. The bronze medal was won by Britain's Max Whitlock.
Romania's Sandra Izbașa won gold in the women's vault ahead of silver medalist McKayla Maroney of the United States after the American failed to land her second vault. Maria Paseka of Russia won the bronze.

Sailing
Great Britain's Ben Ainslie won the men's Finn class. This was his fourth consecutive Olympic gold medal and his fifth medal overall, making him the most successful sailor in Olympic history.
Having been third going into the final medal race Fredrik Lööf and Max Salminen won gold for Sweden in the men's Star. Defending champions Iain Percy and Andrew Simpson of Great Britain won silver and Brazilian pair Robert Scheidt and Bruno Prada won bronze.

Shooting
In the men's 50 metre Pistol Jin Jong-oh scored 662 points, beating fellow South Korean Choi Young-Rae to the gold medal by half a point.

Tennis
In a repeat of the 2012 Wimbledon men's singles final Andy Murray faced Roger Federer in the final of the men's singles. Murray won 6–2, 6–1, 6–4 to take gold for Great Britain, with Federer taking silver for Switzerland. Juan Martín del Potro defeated Novak Djokovic 7–5, 6–4 in the Bronze medal match.
Serena and Venus Williams won their third gold medal in the women's doubles tournament for the United States, defeating silver medalists Andrea Hlaváčková and Lucie Hradecká of the Czech Republic, 6–4, 6–4.
Victoria Azarenka and Max Mirnyi won gold in the mixed doubles tournament, defeating silver medalists Andy Murray and Laura Robson of Great Britain, 2–6, 6–3, [10–8].

Weightlifting
China's Zhou Lulu took gold in the women's +75 kg setting a new world record of 333 kg in the total weight, as well as an Olympic record of 187 kg in clean and jerk. Second placed Tatiana Kashirina of Russia set a new world record of 151 kg in the snatch.

Wrestling
Iran's Hamid Sourian claimed gold in the men's Greco-Roman 55 kg beating Rovshan Bayramov of Azerbaijan in the final.
Russia's Roman Vlasov won gold in the men's Greco-Roman 74 kg beating Arsen Julfalakyan of Armenia in the final.

Day 10: Mon 6 August
Athletics
Jenn Suhr of the United States won the gold medal in the women's pole vault with Yarisley Silva of Cuba taking the silver and defending champion Yelena Isinbayeva of Russia earning bronze.
Valerie Adams of New Zealand claimed gold in the women's shot put final. Yevgeniya Kolodko  of Russia took silver and Gong Lijiao of China won the bronze, after Nadzeya Ostapchuk of Belarus, who had initially been awarded the gold, was stripped of the medal following a failed drug test.
Félix Sánchez of the Dominican Republic regained the men's 400 metres hurdles title that he had first won at the 2004 Olympics finishing in a time of 47.63 seconds. American Michael Tinsley took silver and Javier Culson won bronze, becoming Puerto Rico's first Olympic medalist from a sport other than boxing.
Reigning world champion Yuliya Zaripova of Russia took gold in the women's 3000 metres steeplechase with Habiba Ghribi of Tunisia taking the silver and Sofia Assefa of Ethiopia earning the bronze.
In the men's 400 metres, Kirani James won gold, becoming Grenada's first ever Olympic medalist. Luguelín Santos of the Dominican Republic won silver and bronze went to Trinidad and Tobago's Lalonde Gordon.

Cycling
Great Britain's Jason Kenny beat Grégory Baugé of France in the final of the men's sprint to win his second gold medal of the Games.

Equestrian
The Great Britain quartet of Scott Brash, Peter Charles, Ben Maher and Nick Skelton took gold in the team show jumping after winning a jump-off against the Netherlands who took silver. Saudi Arabia won the bronze medal.

Gymnastics
Arthur Zanetti of Brazil won gold in the men's rings with Chen Yibing of China taking silver and Matteo Morandi of Italy winning bronze.
Russia's Aliya Mustafina won gold in the women's uneven bars with He Kexin of China taking silver and Great Britain's Beth Tweddle winning bronze.
Yang Hak-Seon of South Korea took gold in the men's vault. Silver went to Denis Ablyazin of Russia with Ukraine's Ihor Radivilov taking bronze.

Sailing
Xu Lijia of China won gold in the women's Laser Radial class with Marit Bouwmeester of the Netherlands taking the silver and Belgium's Evi Van Acker earning bronze.
Tom Slingsby of Australia won gold in the men's Laser class with Pavlos Kontides of Cyprus earning silver and Rasmus Myrgren of Sweden taking bronze.

Shooting
Italy's Niccolò Campriani won gold in the men's 50 metre rifle three positions, setting an Olympic record during the qualifying round.
Croatia's Giovanni Cernogoraz won gold in the men's trap after beating Italy's Massimo Fabbrizi in a shoot-off. Kuwait's Fehaid Al-Deehani also needed a shoot-off to win the bronze medal.

Weightlifting
Oleksiy Torokhtiy of Ukraine lifted a total of 412 kg to win the men's 105 kg division by 1 kg from silver medalist Navab Nassirshalal of Iran. Poland's Bartłomiej Bonk won bronze.

Wrestling
Omid Norouzi of Iran defeated Georgia's Revaz Lashkhi in the final of the men's Greco-Roman 60 kg event. Bronze medals went to Zaur Kuramagomedov of Russia and Ryūtarō Matsumoto of Japan.
Russian Alan Khugayev won gold in the men's Greco-Roman 84 kg  event, defeating Karam Gaber of Egypt 1–0, 2–0 in the final.
Cuba's Mijaín López retained his Olympic title in the Men's Greco-Roman 120 kg as he defeated Heiki Nabi of Estonia in the final. The two bronze medals were won by reigning world champion, Rıza Kayaalp of Turkey, and Sweden's Johan Eurén.

Day 11: Tue 7 August
Athletics
Russian Ivan Ukhov won gold in the men's high jump by clearing a height of 2.38 m. American Erik Kynard took silver after jumping 2.33 m. Six athletes finished tied on 2.29 m but only three were awarded joint bronze due to clearing the height in less attempts; Mutaz Essa Barshim of Qatar, Derek Drouin of Canada and Robert Grabarz of Great Britain earned the medals.
Robert Harting of Germany threw 68.27 m to win gold in the men's discus throw and extend his unbeaten record stretching back to August 2010. Ehsan Haddadi of Iran won silver and defending Olympic champion Gerd Kanter of Estonia won bronze.
 Sally Pearson of Australia won the women's 100 metres hurdles final in an Olympic Record time of 12.35, over Dawn Harper of the United States by 0.02 seconds. She was also the first Australian female athlete to clinch a gold medal in the track and field since Cathy Freeman in 2000.
Taoufik Makhloufi won gold in the men's 1500 metres. Makhloufi had been expelled from the Games for not trying in his 800 metres heat but was reinstated after medical evidence was produced to prove he had an injury.

Cycling
Laura Trott of Great Britain won her second gold medal of the Games, adding the women's omnium title to her victory in the team pursuit.
 Australia's Anna Meares beat Great Britain's Victoria Pendleton in the final of the women's sprint.
Chris Hoy won gold in the men's keirin, Maximilian Levy of Germany took silver and there was a dead heat for the bronze with Teun Mulder of the Netherlands and Simon van Velthooven of New Zealand each awarded a medal. This was Hoy's sixth Olympic gold medal, making him the British athlete with the most Olympic golds, and his seventh total medal, tying him with Bradley Wiggins for the record for a British Olympian.

Diving
Ilya Zakharov of Russia became the first non-Chinese diver to win the gold in the men's 3 metre springboard with a total score of 555.90. Chinese divers Kai Qin and He Chong won silver and bronze respectively.

Equestrian
Carl Hester, Laura Bechtolsheimer and Charlotte Dujardin, won Great Britain's first ever medal in Olympic dressage by taking gold in the team event. The German team, winners of the event at the previous seven Summer Games won silver and bronze went to the Netherlands.

Gymnastics
In the men's parallel bars final Chinese gymnast Feng Zhe scored 15.966 to win gold ahead of Germany's Marcel Nguyen (15.800) and France's Hamilton Sabot (15.566), who won silver and bronze respectively.
China's Deng Linlin (15.600) won gold in the women's balance beam final with silver going to fellow Chinese gymnast Sui Lu (15.500). Cătălina Ponor of Romania was initially placed third with 15.066 but, following an appeal, American Aly Raisman had her score raised from 14.966 to 15.066 enough to take her ahead of Ponor for the bronze medal based on a higher execution score.
Epke Zonderland became the first male Dutch gymnast to win an Olympic medal with gold in the horizontal bar. Germany's Fabian Hambüchen won silver and China's defending Olympic and world champion, Zou Kai, won bronze.
United States' Aly Raisman added to her team gold and balance beam bronze by taking gold in the women's floor event with a score of 15.600. Romanian Cătălina Ponor took silver with 15.200 and bronze went to Russia's Aliya Mustafina (14.900).

Sailing
Dorian van Rijsselberghe of the Netherlands won the men's sailboard, the Dutchman went into the final medal race with the gold medal already assured. Great Britain's Nick Dempsey won silver and bronze went to Poland's Przemysław Miarczyński.
Spain's Marina Alabau won gold in the women's sailboard ahead of Finland's silver medalist Tuuli Petäjä and Zofia Klepacka of Poland, who took bronze.

Synchronized swimming
Russia's Natalia Ishchenko and Svetlana Romashina won gold in the women's duet with a score of 197.100 points. Spain's Ona Carbonell and Andrea Fuentes won silver, bronze went to China's Huang Xuechen and Liu Ou.

Table tennis
The Chinese trio of Ding Ning, Li Xiaoxia and Guo Yue won gold in the women's team event, defeating Ai Fukuhara, Sayaka Hirano and Kasumi Ishikawa of Japan by three matches to nil. The team from Singapore finished third after beating South Korea three matches to nil in the bronze medal final.

Triathlon
Alistair Brownlee of Great Britain won gold in the men's triathlon, silver went to Spain's Javier Gómez and bronze to Alaistair's brother Jonathan Brownlee. The Brownlees became the first brothers to share the podium in an individual event in over 100 years.

Weightlifting
Iran completed a one-two in the men's +105 kg event as Behdad Salimi won gold and Sajjad Anoushiravani won silver. The bronze medal was won by Ruslan Albegov of Russia. Germany's Matthias Steiner, the defending Olympic champion, was sent to hospital for x-rays after he dropped the barbell on his head and neck while attempting to lift 196 kg.

Wrestling
South Korea's Kim Hyeon-Woo defeated Hungary's Tamás Lőrincz in the final of the men's Greco-Roman 66 kg. Bronze medals went to defending Olympic champion Steeve Guénot of France and to Georgia's Manuchar Tskhadaia.
Iranian Ghasem Rezaei won gold in the men's Greco-Roman 96 kg after he defeated Russia's Rustam Totrov by a score of 2–0 1–0 in the final. Bronze medals were won by Armenian Artur Aleksanyan and Jimmy Lidberg of Sweden.

Day 12: Wed 8 August
Athletics
Brittney Reese of the United States jumped 7.12 meters to win gold in the women's long jump. Russia's Elena Sokolova won the silver medal and American Janay DeLoach won the bronze.
Natalya Antyukh of Russia won gold in the women's 400 metres hurdles; her time of 52.70 seconds missed the Olympic record by 0.06 seconds. American world champion Lashinda Demus won silver and the bronze went to Zuzana Hejnová of the Czech Republic.
Allyson Felix of the United States won gold in the women's 200 metres after winning silver in the event at the previous two Summer Olympics. Silver went to Jamaica's 100 metres champion, Shelly-Ann Fraser-Pryce and bronze was won by American Carmelita Jeter.
The United States' Aries Merritt ran a time 12.92 seconds as he won the men's 110 metres hurdles final, fellow American Jason Richardson, the reigning world champion, was second in 13.04 seconds and the bronze medal was won by Jamaican Hansle Parchment in 13.12 seconds.

Canoeing
Eirik Verås Larsen of Norway won gold in the men's K-1 1000 metres in a time of 3:26.462. Adam van Koeverden of Canada was second in a time of 3:27.170 followed by Germany's Max Hoff in 3:27.759.
Sebastian Brendel of Germany finished in a time of 3:47.176 to win gold in the men's C-1 1000 metres final. David Cal of Spain finished nearly a second behind the winner to take silver and Canada's Mark Oldershaw won the bronze.
Hungarian pair Rudolf Dombi and Roland Kökény added the Olympic gold medal to their European title in the men's K-2 1000 metres. Fernando Pimenta and Emanuel Silva of Portugal won the nation's first ever Olympic medaling in sprint canoeing as they took silver ahead of the German defending Olympic champions Martin Hollstein and Andreas Ihle who won bronze.
In the women's K-4 500 metres the Hungarian quartet of Gabriella Szabó, Danuta Kozák, Katalin Kovács and Krisztina Fazekas Zur won gold to end a run of four straight Olympic titles in the event for Germany, who won the silver medal. Bronze went to the team from Belarus.

Equestrian
Steve Guerdat took the gold medal in individual jumping, while Dutch rider Gerco Schröder took silver and Ireland's Cian O'Connor took bronze. Guerdat became the first Swiss rider to win an Olympic title in show jumping since Alphonse Gemuseus in 1924.

Sailing
 Australia's Nathan Outteridge and Iain Jensen had an unassailable lead going into the final of the 49er class, picking up the gold medal from the New Zealand pair of Peter Burling and Blair Tuke.

Table tennis
China won the men's team event to complete a sweep of all the table tennis gold medals for the second consecutive Olympics. The Chinese team of Zhang Jike, Ma Long and Wang Hao defeated their South Korean opponents, Oh Sang-Eun, Joo Se-Hyuk and Ryu Seung-Min by a score of 3–0 in the final. Bronze went to Germany.

Taekwondo
Wu Jingyu of China successfully defended her Olympic title in the women's 49 kg event by defeating Spain's Brigitte Yagüe by a score of 8–1 in the final. Bronze medals were awarded to Thailand's Chanatip Sonkham and Croatia's Lucija Zaninović.
World and European champion Joel González Bonilla of Spain became Olympic champion in the men's 58 kg; he defeated South Korean Lee Dae-Hoon by a score of 17–8 in the final to take gold. Russian Aleksey Denisenko and Colombian Óscar Muñoz won bronze medals.

Volleyball
Misty May-Treanor and Kerri Walsh of the United States defeated fellow Americans Jennifer Kessy and April Ross in the women's beach volleyball final, 21–16, 21–16, to win their third consecutive Olympic gold medal. Juliana Silva and Larissa França of Brazil defeated Xue Chen and Zhang Xi of China, 11–21, 21–19, 15–12, for the bronze medal.

Wrestling
Japan's eight-time world champion Hitomi Obara won gold in the women's freestyle 48 kg having dropped down a weight division in order to compete in the Olympics for the first time. Mariya Stadnik of Azerbaijan won silver, bronze medals were awarded to American Clarissa Chun and Canadian Carol Huynh.
Kaori Icho of Japan became the first female wrestler to win three Olympic gold medals by beating Jing Ruixue of China 3–0, 2–0, in the final of the women's freestyle 63 kg. Lubov Volosova of Russia and Soronzonboldyn Battsetseg of Mongolia won the bronze medals.

Day 13: Thu 9 August
Athletics
 United States' Christian Taylor and Will Claye took gold and silver in the men's triple jump. Taylor's jump of 17.81 metres was a world leading distance for 2012. Italy's Fabrizio Donato won bronze.
Kenya's David Rudisha broke his own world record to win gold in the men's 800 metres in a time of 1:40.91. Nijel Amos of Botswana won the silver medal, his nation's first Olympic medal in any sport. Bronze was won by Kenya's Timothy Kitum. Of the eight competitors in the final seven of them ran personal bests, two of which were new national records. Sebastian Coe, the chairman of the London Organising Committee of the Olympic and Paralympic Games and a former Olympic 800 metres champion himself, described Rudisha's run as "the performance of the Games, not just of track and field but of the Games".
In the men's 200 metres, Jamaica swept the medals with Usain Bolt taking gold in 19.32 seconds, Yohan Blake silver in 19.44, and Warren Weir bronze with 19.84. Bolt became the first man to win the 200 metres in two Olympics and the first to win the 100 and 200m races double in two Olympics.
 The world record holder in women's javelin throw, the Czech Republic's Barbora Špotáková, won gold with a 69.55 metre throw. Germany's Christina Obergföll took silver with 65.16 m and Linda Stahl took bronze with 64.91 m.
 The United States' Ashton Eaton and Trey Hardee took gold and silver respectively in the men's decathlon. Cuba's Leonel Suárez won the bronze.
 In the heats of the men's 4 × 400m relay, United States leadoff runner Manteo Mitchell broke his leg near the 200 m mark but managed to finish the race. The United States tied for first with the Bahamas to qualify for the final.

Boxing
Great Britain's Nicola Adams won the first ever women's Olympic boxing gold medal, defeating Ren Cancan of China 16–7 in the final of the flyweight division. Bronze medals went to Mary Kom of India and the United States' Marlen Esparza.
Katie Taylor of Ireland defeated Russia's Sofya Ochigava 16–8 to win the gold medal in the women's lightweight.
Seventeen-year-old American Claressa Shields won gold in the women's middleweight, defeating Russia's Nadezda Torlopova by a score of 19–12 in the final.

Canoeing
Germany's Peter Kretschmer and Kurt Kuschela won the men's C-2 1000 metres ahead of defending Olympic champions Andrei and Aliaksandr Bahdanovich of Belarus. Bronze went to Alexey Korovashkov and Ilya Pervukhin of Russia.
Australia beat out Hungary and the Czech Republic in the final of the men's K-4 1000 metres.
Hungary's two-time European champion Danuta Kozák won gold in the women's K-1 500 metres. Ukraine's defending Olympic champion Inna Osypenko won silver and Bridgitte Hartley of South Africa won bronze.
German pair Franziska Weber and Tina Dietze won the gold medal in the women's K-2 500 metres. Hungary's Katalin Kovacs and Natasa Douchev-Janics won silver and bronze went to Poland's Beata Mikolajczyk and Karolina Naja.

Diving
China's Chen Ruolin won her second consecutive gold medal in the Women's 10 metre platform.

Equestrian
Great Britain's Charlotte Dujardin and Laura Bechtolsheimer added to the gold medals they won in the team dressage by taking gold and bronze respectively in the individual dressage. Dujardin, the final competitor to ride, set a new Olympic record score of 90.089% to knock the Netherlands Adelinde Cornelissen into silver medal position.

Football
The United States defend their Olympic title in the women's football tournament by defeating world champions Japan 2–1 in a rematch of the 2011 FIFA Women's World Cup Final with Carli Lloyd scoring both goals. Canada won the bronze medal with a 1–0 victory over France.

Swimming
Hungary's Éva Risztov led for most of the race as she won gold in the women's marathon. American Haley Anderson won silver and Italy's Martina Grimaldi held off the reigning world champion, Britain's Keri-Anne Payne, to win the bronze.

Taekwondo
Jade Jones of Great Britain beat China's Hou Yuzhuo 6–4 in the final of the women's 57 kg division to claim her nation's first ever Olympic taekwondo gold medal. Bronze medals went to France's Marlène Harnois and Tseng Li-Cheng of Chinese Taipei.
World number one Servet Tazegül of Turkey won the gold medal in the men's 68 kg after he defeated Iran's Mohammad Bagheri Motamed 6–4 in the final. Bronze medals were won by Terrence Jennings of the United States and Afghanistan's Rohullah Nikpai, who matched his result from 2008 when he won his nation's first ever Olympic medal.

Volleyball
Men's beach final at 21:00.

Water polo
The United States won the gold medal in the women's event after an 8–5 victory over Spain in the final.

Wrestling
Women's freestyle 55 kg final at 19:03.
Women's freestyle 72 kg final at 19:48.

Day 14: Fri 10 August
Athletics
 Renaud Lavillenie set an Olympic record of 5.97 metres, and became the third French man to win gold in the men's pole vault. Bjorn Otto and Raphael Holzdeppe, both from Germany, claimed the silver and bronze, respectively.
Women's hammer throw final at 19:35.
Women's 5000 metres final at 20:05.
Women's 4 × 100 metres relay final at 20:40.
Women's 1500 metres finals at 20:55.
Men's 4 × 400 metres relay final at 21:20.

Cycling
 Maris Strombergs became the first Latvian athlete to win two Olympic medals and successfully defended his Olympic title in the men's BMX event.
 Colombia's Mariana Pajón won gold at the women's BMX event, and first for her nation since 2000.

Field hockey
The Netherlands defeat Argentina 2–0 in the final of the women's tournament to defend their Olympic title. Hosts Great Britain defeat New Zealand 3–1 in the bronze medal match.

Football
South Korea beat Japan 2–0 to win the bronze medal match in the men's football tournament.

Sailing
Men's 470 class final at 12:00.
Women's 470 class final at 14:00.

Swimming
Men's marathon final at 12:00.

Synchronized swimming
Women's team final at 15:00.

Taekwondo
South Korea's Hwang Kyung-Seon successfully defended her Olympic title by beating European champion Nur Tatar of Turkey in the final of the women's 67 kg event. The two bronze medals were won by Paige McPherson of the United States, and Germany's Helena Fromm.
Sebastián Crismanich of Argentina defeated Spain's Nicolás García in the gold medal bout of the men's 80 kg. Bronze medals were won by Great Britain's Lutalo Muhammad and Italy's Mauro Sarmiento.

Wrestling
Men's freestyle 55 kg.
Men's freestyle 74 kg.

Day 15: Sat 11 August
Athletics
Men's 50 kilometres walk finals at 09:00.
Women's 20 kilometres walk final at 17:00.
Women's high jump final at 19:00.
 Keshorn Walcott (Trinidad and Tobago) became the first non-European athlete to win a gold medal in the men's javelin throw since Cy Young in 1952, and the first Trinidadian in a field event and in any Olympic event since Hasely Crawford in 1976.
Men's 5000 metres final at 19:30.
Women's 800 metres final at 20:00.
Women's 4 × 400 metres relay final at 20:25.
Men's 4 × 100 metres relay final at 21:00.

Basketball
Women finals at 21:00.

Boxing
Men's light flyweight final at 20:30.
Men's bantamweight final at 20:45.
Men's light welterweight final at 21:15.
Men's heavyweight final at 21:30.
Men's middleweight final at 21:45.

Canoeing
Men's K-1 200 metres final at 09:30.
Men's C-1 200 metres final at 09:47.
Women's K-1 200 metres final at 10:14.
Men's K-2 200 metres final at 10:41.

Cycling
Women's cross-country finals at 12:30.

Diving
David Boudia became the first American diver to win a gold medal in the men's 10 metre platform since Greg Louganis in 1988.

Field hockey
Germany defeat The Netherlands 2–1 in the final of the men's tournament to defend their Olympic title.    Australia win the bronze medal after defeating hosts Great Britain 3–1 in the bronze medal match.

Football
Mexico win the gold medal in the men's football tournament for the very first time after beating Brazil 2–1 in the final which saw the fastast goal scored in Men's Olympic Final history when Oribe Peralta scored in the opening minute and also went on to score the winning goal.

Gymnastics
Women's rhythmic individual all-around Evgeniya Kanaeva from Russian Federation wins the individual all-around title for the second time and thereby becoming the only rhythmic gymnast in history to claim more than a single gold medal in the discipline, winning by a wide margin of 2.4 ahead of fellow Russian Daria Dmitrieva with a score of 116.900.

Handball
Women's final at 20:30.

Modern pentathlon
Men's final at 08:45.

Sailing
Elliott 6m final at 13:05.

Taekwondo
Women's +67 kg final at 22:15.
Men's +80 kg final at 22:30.

Volleyball
Women's final at 18:30.

Wrestling
Men's freestyle 60 kg.
Men's freestyle 84 kg.
Men's freestyle 120 kg.

Day 16: Sun 12 August
Athletics
 Stephen Kiprotich of Uganda won the gold medal in the men's marathon and was the first gold medal winner for the country since the 1972 Summer Olympic Games.

Basketball
 The United States successfully defended their Olympic title in the men's basketball final after beating Spain in a rematch of the 2008 final, 107–100, in a closely fought game.

Boxing
 Robeisy Ramírez of Cuba wins gold in the Men's flyweight final after defeating Nyambayaryn Tögstsogt.
 In the Men's lightweight final Vasyl Lomachenko of the Ukraine wins his second gold medal in successive games after easily beating Han Soon-Chul of South Korea
 Kazakhstan's Serik Sapiyev wins gold in the Men's welterweight after defeating Fred Evens of Great Britain.
 Egor Mekhontsev of Russia wins the gold medal on a judges decision in the Men's light heavyweight final against Adilbek Niyazymbetov.
 Anthony Joshua of Great Britain wins the host nation's 29th and final gold medal of the games after beating the twice and reigning Olympic champion Roberto Cammarelle of Italy in the Men's super heavyweight final on a judges decision.

Closing ceremony
 Commencing at 21:00.

Cycling
 Men's cross-country final at 13:30.

Gymnastics
 Women's rhythmic group all-around Russian Federation wins for the fourth time in a row the gold medal of the team all around competition, a run that begun in Sydney 2000

Handball
 Men's finals at 15:00.

Modern pentathlon
 Women's final at 08:45.

Volleyball
 Men's tournament final at 13:00.

Water polo
 Men's final at 15:50.

Wrestling
 Men's freestyle 66 kg.
 Men's freestyle 96 kg.

References

External links
 

Chronological summary
2012